is a Japanese former actress and businesswoman.

Filmography

Films 
 1962 Foundry Town - Kaori
 1969 Red Lion 
 1972 Gecko Kung Fu 
 1973 A Man Called Tiger - Yoshida Ayako. 
 1974 Karafuto 1945 Summer Hyosetsu no Mon - Natsuko Saito

Television series 
 1969-1970 Wakadaishō series - Akiko Oshima
 1969-1970 Sain wa V (TV series) - Yumi Asaoka
 1979 Seibu Keisatsu

Writings
Shippai nante kowakunai (1998, published by KSS)  - autobiography

References

External links
 Okada Kawai in hkmdb.com
 Kawai Okada at imdb.com

1948 births
Japanese actresses
Living people
People from Osaka